In geometry, the Poncelet point of four given points is defined as follows:

Let  be four points in the plane that do not form an orthocentric system and such that no three of them are collinear. The nine-point circles of triangles  meet at one point, the Poncelet point of the points .  (If  do form an orthocentric system, then triangles  all share the same nine-point circle, and the Poncelet point is undefined.)

Properties

References

Euclidean plane geometry